Blessid Union of Souls (sometimes abbreviated to Blessid Union or BUOS) is an American alternative rock band from Cincinnati, Ohio, that was formed in 1990 by friends Jeff Pence and Eliot Sloan.

The band's first studio album, Home, had some success which lay with its lead single, "I Believe". The song popularized the band with local-area DJs and is the group's most successful song. Their second album, the self-titled Blessid Union of Souls, did not have nearly the success of Home, but their third album, Walking Off the Buzz, spawned the hit single "Hey Leonardo (She Likes Me for Me)".

After the release of their greatest-hits album, Blessid Union of Souls: The Singles, which actually collected more outtakes and B-sides than previous hits, they released Perception. The band's sixth album, Close to the Edge, was released in 2008.

History

Early years
Blessid Union of Souls formed in 1990 with guitarist Jeff Pence (Morrow, Ohio), vocalist/pianist Eliot Sloan (Cincinnati, Ohio), keyboardist C.P. Roth (who had been in Ozzy Osbourne's touring band), and drummer Eddie Hedges. Sloan and Hedges had previously played together in a band in the 1980s called The Movies (not to be confused with the British pub rock band of the same name). The band's name originated from an episode of the TV series M*A*S*H.

The band was heavily influenced by the cowpunk scene that was burgeoning around the time they formed. They spent several years honing their craft in Newport News, and their song "Oh Virginia" is a tribute to their "second home".

In 1992, the band sent a demo to EMI Records who immediately offered them a contract and spread the word about them.

Home (1994–1996)
They began writing more songs in about 1993 for their debut album, Home. It took over two years to complete, but before it was released, DJs in the Cincinnati area began playing "I Believe", which would become the album's most popular single.

They finally released Home in March 1995. Later that year, it was certified gold by the RIAA. It is now certified platinum. The album’s most popular song was the aforementioned "I Believe", with reached #8 on the Billboard Hot 100, #2 on the magazine’s Mainstream Top 40 chart, and #1 on the CHR/Pop survey from Radio & Records. It also spawned the Top 40 hits "Oh Virginia" and "Let Me Be the One", which was featured in the soap opera All My Children.

Blessid Union of Souls (1996–1998)
After EMI Records collapsed in 1996, the band signed with Capitol Records and added bassist Tony Clark in the process.

They released their second album, Blessid Union of Souls in 1997. This album was not as popular as Home, but still released two Top 40 hits, "I Wanna Be There" and "Light in Your Eyes".

Walking Off the Buzz (1999–2000)
They released their third album, Walking Off the Buzz, in 1999. This album was moderately popular due to "Hey Leonardo (She Likes Me for Me)", a single from the album that reached the Top 40 but stalled at No. 33 on the Billboard Hot 100. The single did, however, reach the top ten on both the Billboard Mainstream Top 40 chart, where it peaked at number eight and gave the band its second top ten hit there, and the CHR/Pop chart published by Radio & Records, peaking at number seven and giving Blessid Union of Souls its third (and, to date, last) top ten on that particular chart.

2001–2005
Between 2001 and 2005, Blessid Union of Souls stayed away from the studio, but they released a greatest hits album that also featured a few previously unreleased songs that were recorded around 2000. During this time, they still toured. One of their shows was at Great Valley High School in Pennsylvania. Roth and Hedges left the band in 2002 and were replaced by Kyle Robinson, and then by Shaun Schaefer on drums and Bryan Billhimer on guitar.

Perception and reemergence (2005–2008)
At the end of this period, the band's fourth studio album Perception was released.

In the beginning of 2008, Blessid Union of Souls began touring with members Eliot Sloan, Tony Clark, Bryan Billhimer, and Shaun Schaefer, as Jeff Pence had amicably left the band in order to focus on his multimedia production career.

Close to the Edge (2008–2010)
Blessid Union of Souls's fifth studio album, Close to the Edge, was released on September 16, 2008, on Torque Records. Eight of its twelve tracks were taken from their previous album, Perception. There was only one single released for the album, "Could've Been with You".

The Mission Field (2011–2012)
The band's debut Contemporary Christian album, The Mission Field, was released on Salvation Road Records through Sony/Provident in March 2011. The first single, "The Only Song", reached number 32 on the Nielsen BDS Christian AC chart. The video for "The Only Song" was also added to the Gospel Music Channel & JCTV.
The second single, "Pray for You", was released on July 15, 2011.

Home 25 (2020–present) 
To celebrate the 25th anniversary of their debut album, the band released Home 25, a limited-edition vinyl album that included vintage live versions of Home classics and Home-era demo recordings.

Other projects

In 1995, they covered the song 'Way Over Yonder' by Carole King for the tribute album Tapestry Revisited: A Tribute to Carole King.

In 1998, the band recorded "Brother My Brother" for Pokémon: The First Movie, where it was used during the battle between Mew, Mewtwo, the originals and their clones.

In 2000, several of the band's songs were scheduled for use during the production of a film titled Standing at the Edge of the Earth by Fizzle Freak Productions. The film would have co-starred the band's bassist Tony Clark, and the rest of the band would have been featured in prominent roles as well. The film's production was canceled in around the end of 2000 due to legal and financial issues.

In 2003, the band released Blessid Union of Souls: Play Ball, an album about the Cincinnati Reds. The title track was used to promote the team in their first season in Great American Ballpark. This album did not receive much attention outside of Cincinnati.

In 2005, the band recorded "We are the Washington Nationals." A song to mark the 2005 Washington Nationals season, Washington, D.C.'s first MLB season since 1971.

In 2006, Jeff Pence headed a project in which the band contributed two tracks for Clutch Hits, a CD that featured a variety of artists who contributed songs about the Cincinnati Reds. The songs were titled "Play Ball" and "Me, Marty, Joe, Ted & Louise". The project was a fundraiser for the Reds Community Fund.

In 2012, they began the project Hear 2 Heal which is an interactive, performing arts project featuring Eliot Sloan along with the performing arts students of selected schools in order to give the students an opportunity to be heard and address their issues through the music of Blessid Union and their media of choice (choir/band/theatre/AV/dance) and heal through the process of expression and opening lines of communication. The project began with Brownsburg High School in Brownsburg, Indiana, on November 2 and sought to reach to other schools in Indiana, Illinois, Missouri, and Kentucky.

Discography

Studio albums

Compilation albums

Singles

They also performed a track in Pokémon: The First Movie titled "Brother My Brother" and the main theme for Ace Ventura: When Nature Calls titled "It's Alright".

Music videos

References

External links
 Current band's official website

Alternative rock groups from Ohio
Christian rock groups from Ohio
Musical groups established in 1990
Musical groups from Cincinnati